Sultans is the introductory EP by the San Diego, California rock and roll band Sultans, released in 2000 by Swami Records. It was the band's first release and contained one track that would also appear on their debut album Ghost Ship later that year.

Track listing
"Just a Fool (That's Down)"
"Running Far From Home"
"Don't Hurry (To Come Back to Me)"
"Despise"

Performers
Slasher (John Reis) - bass, lead vocals
Black Flame (Andy Stamets) - guitar, backing vocals
Tony Di Prima - drums, backing vocals
John Reis - producer

References

2000 EPs
Sultans (band) albums
Swami Records EPs